Gary Namie is a social psychologist and anti-workplace bullying activist. He is the co-founder and director of the Workplace Bullying Institute, and is widely regarded as North America's foremost authority on the topic of workplace bullying.

Education

Namie has an AB from Washington & Jefferson College in Washington, Pennsylvania, and an MA in Research Psychology from San Francisco State University and a PhD in social psychology from the University of California, Santa Barbara in 1982.

In 1982, Namie won both the Teaching of Psychology award from the American Psychological Association and the Best on Campus Teaching Award from University of California, Santa Barbara.

Career
Namie taught psychology and management at US colleges for two decades. He was also served as a corporate manager for two regional hospital systems.

In 1997, after s wife Ruth (who has a doctorate in clinical psychology herself) was subject to harassment by her employer, the Namies launched the Workplace Bullying Institute (WBI), a national campaign against workplace bullying. Namie created the Respectful Conduct Clinic, a program designed to rehabilitate perpetrators of abusive bullying in the workplace, and he created and delivered the first U.S. college course on workplace bullying at Western Washington University.

In 2003, Namie began lobbying for the Healthy Workplace Bill, authored by Employment Law professor David C. Yamada of Suffolk University, which has been introduced in 31 states. Namie continues to serve as the National Director for the bill.

In 2005, Namie was the expert witness in the nation's first "bullying trial" in Indiana with the verdict upheld by the state Supreme Court. A jury award of $325,000 was sustained. The precedent-setting statement from the Supreme Court opinion:

The phrase ‘workplace bullying,’ like other general terms used to characterize a person’s behavior, is an entirely appropriate consideration…workplace bullying could be considered a form of intentional infliction of emotional distress.

Starting in 2007, the Workplace Bullying Institute has commissioned Zogby Analytics to conduct the representative surveys of all adult Americans on the topic of workplace bullying. The latest survey reports that 30% of American workers have experienced workplace bullying.

In 2008, Namie created Workplace Bullying University®, a comprehensive training for professionals.

In 2014, Namie was retained by celebrity and sports attorney Wm. David Cornwell to serve as expert witness in a bullying scandal involving Jonathan Martin and the Miami Dolphins.

In 2015, Namie and Yamada founded the U.S. Academy of Workplace Bullying, Mobbing and Abuse to “focus on the unique challenges posed by American employee relations, mental health, and legal systems.”

In 2021, Namie created SafeHarbor, the first online community dedicated to people affected by workplace bullying and those devoted to helping them.

Publications

References

External links
Workplace Bullying Institute
2021 WBI U.S. Workplace Bullying Survey
Healthy Workplace Bill
Workplace Bullying University
SafeHarbor
Respectful Conduct Clinic

Year of birth missing (living people)
Living people
21st-century American psychologists
Washington & Jefferson College alumni
San Francisco State University alumni
University of California, Santa Barbara alumni
Anti-bullying activists
Academics and writers on bullying
Workplace bullying